John 1:2 is the second verse in the first chapter of the Gospel of John in the New Testament of the Christian Bible.

Content
In the original Greek according to Westcott-Hort this verse is:
Οὗτος ἦν ἐν ἀρχῇ πρὸς τὸν Θεόν.  
Outos ēn en archē pros ton Theon.

In the King James Version of the Bible the text reads:
The same was in the beginning with God.

The New International Version translates the passage as:
He was with God in the beginning.

Analysis
This verse seems to allude to Prov. 8:22, "The Lord possessed me in the beginning of His ways, before He made anything, from the beginning." and Genesis 1:1, "In the beginning..."

This verse is often used to confute Arianism, which holds that God was created in the beginning, while this verse seems to imply that the word (λογος) simply existed in the beginning, and therefore always existed. Lapide asks the question why a beginning is spoken of at all if the word (λογος) is eternal and has no beginning. To this he answers, "because of the weakness of the human intellect, which is not able to comprehend eternity."

Witham notes that although the text has "this (ουτος) was in the beginning;" the sense and construction certainly is, "this word was in the beginning."

Commentary from the Church Fathers
Hilary of Poitiers: "Whereas he had said, the Word was God, the fearfulness, and strangeness of the speech disturbed me; the prophets having declared that God was One. But, to quiet my apprehensions, the fisherman reveals the scheme of this so great mystery, and refers all to one, without dishonour, without obliterating [the Person], without reference to time, saying, The Same was in the beginning with God; with One Unbegotten God, from whom He is, the One Only-begotten God."

Theophylact of Ohrid: " Again, to stop any diabolical suspicion, that the Word, because He was God, might have rebelled against His Father, as certain Gentiles fable, or, being separate, have become the antagonist of the Father Himself, he says, The Same was in the beginning with God; that is to say, this Word of God never existed separate from God."

Chrysostom: "Or, lest hearing that In the beginning was the Word, you should regard It as eternal, but yet understand the Father’s Life to have some degree of priority, he has introduced the words, The Same was in the beginning with God. For God was never solitary, apart from Him, but always God with God. . Or forasmuch as he said, the Word was God, that no one might think the Divinity of the Son inferior, he immediately subjoins the marks of proper Divinity, in that he both again mentions Eternity, The Same was in the beginning with God; and adds His attribute of Creator (τδ δημιουργικὸν), All things were made by Him."

Origen: "Or thus, the Evangelist having begun with those propositions, reunites them into one, saying, The Same was in the beginning with God. For in the first of the three we learnt in what the Word was, that it was in the beginning; in the second, with whom, with God; in the third who the Word was, God. Having, then, by the term, The Same, set before us in a manner God the Word of Whom he had spoken, he collects all into the fourth proposition, viz. In the beginning was the Word, and the Word was with God, and the Word was God; into, the Same was in the beginning with God. It may be asked, however, why it is not said, In the beginning was the Word of God, and the Word of God was with God, and the Word of God was God? Now whoever will admit that truth is one, must needs admit also that the demonstration of truth, that is wisdom, is one. But if truth is one, and wisdom is one, the Word which  truth and  wisdom in those who are capable of receiving it, must be One also. And therefore it would have been out of place here to have said, the Word of God, as if there were other words besides that of God, a word of angels, word of men, and so on. We do not say this, to deny that It is the Word of God, but to show the use of omitting the word God. John himself too in the Apocalypse says, And his Name is called the Word of God. (Rev. 19:13)"

Alcuin: " Wherefore does he use the substantive verb, was? That you might understand that the Word, Which is coeternal with God the Father, was before all time.

References

External links
Other translations of John 1:2 at BibleHub

01:2